The Roy G. Neville Prize in Bibliography or Biography is a biennial award given by the Science History Institute (formerly the Chemical Heritage Foundation) to recognize a biographical work in the field of chemistry or molecular science.  The Roy G. Neville Prize was established in 2006 and named to honor scientist and book collector Roy G. Neville. Neville founded Engineering and Technical Consultants, Redwood City, California, in 1973. He also assembled one of the world's largest collections of rare books in the field of science and technology. The Neville collection,  including over 6,000 titles from the late 15th century to the early 20th century, was acquired by the Chemical Heritage Foundation (now the Science History Institute) in 2004.

Recipients
The following people have received the Neville Award:

2019, Helge Kragh for Julius Thomsen: A Life in Chemistry and Beyond
2017, John C. Powers for Inventing Chemistry: Herman Boerhaave and the Reform of the Chemical Arts
2016 Melvyn Usselman, for Pure Intelligence: The Life of William Hyde Wollaston 
2013 Mary Jo Nye, for Michael Polanyi and His Generation: Origins of the Social Construction of Science
2011 Michael Hunter, for Boyle: Between God and Science
2009 William Hodson Brock, for William Crookes (1832–1919) and the Commercialization of Science
2007 Michael D. Gordin, for A Well-Ordered Thing: Dmitrii Mendeleev and the Shadow of the Periodic Table
2006 Robert E. Schofield, for The Enlightened Joseph Priestley: A Study of His Life and Works from 1773 to 1804

See also
List of history awards
List of chemistry awards
List of prizes named after people

References

Chemistry awards
American literary awards
Awards established in 2006
2006 establishments in the United States
Biography awards
History of science awards
American science and technology awards